Lake Kero is a medium-sized lake of Finland. It is situated in Kuusamo municipality in Northern Ostrobothnia region, and it belongs to the Iijoki main catchment area. The southern part of the lake is called Iso-Kero and northern part is called Keski-Kero.

See also
List of lakes in Finland

References

Lakes of Kuusamo